Chimerino is a tiny village near Neapoli in the Kozani regional unit, Greece. It is situated on the west bank of the Aliakmon river, which is the longest river in Greece.

Cheimerino is the birthplace of Gregory Kytides, professional soccer player in Greece and in South Africa in the 1960s and 1970s.

Populated places in Kozani (regional unit)